Hare Snipe Creek is a tributary of Crabtree Creek that rises in the northern Raleigh, North Carolina.  The creek then flows south to Lake Lynn and on to Crabtree Creek.  The watershed is about 19% forested.

See also
List of rivers of North Carolina

References

External links
 Lake Lynn Park (City of Raleigh)
 Hare Snipe Creek Trail
 Hare Snipe Creek USGS Water Gauge

Rivers of North Carolina
Rivers of Wake County, North Carolina
Tributaries of Pamlico Sound